The 2019 Abkhazian Cup was the 25th edition of Abkhazian Cup organized by Football Federation of Abkhazia. The competition was held in the month of May.

Participating teams
This edition of the competition was attended by 8 teams:

FC Afon,
Samurzakan Gal,
FC Gagra,
FC Dinamo Sukhum,
Nart Sukhum
Ritsa FC.

The Abkhazia Cup champion team qualifies for the Abkhazia Super Cup final and face the Abkhazian Premier League champion team.

The final of the Abkhazia Cup took place on May 14, 2019.
The two teams qualified for the grand final match were Nart Sukhum and Ritsa FC.

Nart Sukhum's team won by the score of 4x0 and became champion of the Abkhazia Cup 2020. With this victory, the club already has eleven Abkhazia Cup trophies.

Games by stage

First stage

Group A

Afon       1-1 Dinamo     
Dinamo     3-0 Samurzakan 
Samurzakan 1-1 Afon       

Final Table:

 1.Dinamo Sukhum          2   1  1  0   4- 1   4  Qualified
 2.FK Afon                2   0  2  0   2- 2   2  Qualified
 - - - - - - - - - - - - - - - - - - - - - - - -
 3.Samurzakan Gal         2   0  1  1   1- 4   1

Group B

Nart       0-2 Ritsa      
Gagra      0-3 Nart       
Ritsa      1-2 Gagra      

Final Table:

 1.Ritsa Gudauta          2   1  0  1   3- 2   3  Qualified
 2.Nart Sukhum            2   1  0  1   3- 2   3  Qualified
 - - - - - - - - - - - - - - - - - - - - - - - -
 3.FK Gagra               2   1  0  1   2- 4   3

Semifinals 
[May 9]
Dinamo     0-3 Nart       
[May 10]
Ritsa      3-1 Afon

Final
[May 14]
Nart       4-0 Ritsa

References

Football in Abkhazia